Nguoi Viet Daily News is the first, oldest, and largest daily newspaper published in Vietnamese outside of Vietnam. The name of their newspaper người Việt symbolizes Vietnamese people".

History
The newspaper was established by husband and wife Yen Ngoc Do and Loan La Do three years after escaping the Vietnam War, in 1978, with their family. Yen had served as a journalist during the Vietnam War, and wrote for such prestigious outlets as the Rand Corporation, while Loan had become a well-known English school teacher after graduating from college. During the Vietnam War, Yen and Loan were one of the few married Vietnamese couples who were each fluent in English, and could readily communicate across the spectrum of individuals - Vietnamese, American, and others - involved in fighting the communists. Therefore, they garnered a vast following from people who were hungry for the news.

The first edition of Nguoi Viet Daily News was a four-page publication, printed and distributed on December 15, 1978, in San Diego, California. 2,000 copies of the first issue, paid for with $4,000 of life savings from the couple's Vietnam War escape, were printed in their garage with the assistance of the other members of their family: four extremely young children.

After operating as a weekly for some time, a company, Nguoi Viet Daily News, Inc. was formed in 1985, and the paper became a daily.

For several years, Nguoi Viet was printed entirely without diacritical marks, because no Vietnamese-capable software was available. Staffers had to mark up each word of each issue by hand. In 1986, the paper adopted the Diplomat input method editor developed by Newport Beach–based VN Labs, allowing it to publish correctly typeset Vietnamese text.

Today 
By founding the newspaper, Yen and Loan were instrumental in helping to establish all of Little Saigon in Southern California.  Their newspaper served as the flagship of the economically vibrant community and is, today, the heart of the largest Vietnamese population outside of the country of Vietnam. The headquarters of "Nguoi Viet Daily News, Inc" is now located in Westminster, Orange County. In fact, the company became such a success that other newer and smaller entities copied its name - since it was a household word - for their own non-media businesses.

Today, the company boasts multiple facets, subsidiaries, and various publications, with the original seminal publication claiming a daily circulation of 20,000+ copies (Verified Audit Circulation). Copies of Nguoi Viet Daily News can be found throughout the marketplace and, in particular, most ethnic communities, and online, in bookstores, at newspaper vending machines, and Vietnamese retail venues throughout the world plus via home-delivery to residences everywhere.

"Nguoi Viet Daily News, Inc." and its founders, Yen and Loan Do, were displayed in a permanent exhibit at the historic Newseum located in Washington, D.C., and the company is responsible for various journalism endowments and scholarships.

Yen died in 2006.  Loan retired, but still serves as an informal advisor to the company.  Their adult children are spread across the continent, with their eldest, Anh Đỗ, an acclaimed journalist in her own right, serving in leadership capacities on many media boards and organizations, and carrying on her parents' legacy in the Golden State.

References

External links
 Official News/Media/Publishing Web site of Người Việt Daily News (Người Việt Online - in Vietnamese)
 Tran, Mai & Silverstein, Stuart. (2006, August 18). Yen Do, 65; Publisher of First, Largest U.S. Vietnamese Paper. The Los Angeles Times

Mass media in Orange County, California
Vietnamese-American culture in California
Vietnamese-language newspapers published in California
Westminster, California
Companies based in Orange County, California
Daily newspapers published in Greater Los Angeles
Newspapers established in 1978
1978 establishments in California